Emmanuel Mogenet (born 1967) is a software engineer, one of the investors and advisors behind Daedalean AI, a company dedicated to artificial intelligence for safety critical aviation applications.

Mogenet was a former senior engineering director at Google Inc. and, until May 2018, lead Google Research Europe, Google's Zürich-based Machine Intelligence Research Center. Before that, he was head of Google's Zürich Search Team.

Born and raised in France, Mogenet received an engineering degree with a specialization in computer science from École nationale supérieure des mines de Saint-Étienne and an M.S. degree from Jean Monnet University, both in 1990.

Mogenet started his career in the field of computer graphics and special effects. He worked in France, Singapore, Japan and the United States for various companies, including Thomson-CSF, Silicon Graphics, Sony Picture Imageworks, Nothing Real and Apple.

In 1996, with a group of friends from Sony Pictures Imageworks, he co-founded Nothing Real, a software company that produced the digital compositing application Shake. Nothing Real was acquired in 2002 by Apple

In 2006, he left Apple to join Google to work on the core search engine.He was with Google until May 2018, where he worked as senior engineering director, leading the Google European Research center in Zürich, Switzerland. with a strong focus on artificial intelligence and machine learning.

References

External links 
 

Living people
Google employees
1967 births